Úlfur Karlsson (born 13 October 1988) is an Icelandic artist and film director.

Úlfur began his career making short films and documentaries. In the year of 2003 Úlfur screened the short film Pirovat at the New York Independent Film and Video Festival. In the year of 2008 he graduated from the National film Institute of Iceland (Icelandic Film School). He has made two short films since Pirovat; Tvísaga, in the year of 2006, and Einskonar Alaska (Kind of Alaska), in the year of 2008, based on a famous radio play by Harold Pinter. In 2009 he graduated from the art school at Akureyri, Myndlistarskólinn á Akureyri. After that he enrolled in Valand School of Fine Arts and graduated with BA degree. At Valand he started painting in Neo-expressionistic style.  Úlfur has had many exhibitions around Iceland, for example at Listasafn ASÍ, Slunkaríki in Ísafjörður and Sláturhúsið at Egilsstaðir. In 2015  Úlfur, along with other young artists in Iceland, took part in an exhibition called Nýmálað (Just Painted)  at Listasafn Reykjavíkur. In the same year he had a private exhibition at Listasafn Reykjavíkur, titled Við erum ekki hrædd (We are not afraid) and an exhibition titled Implant at Wind and Weather Gallery. In 2019 Úlfur had a private exhibition at Galerie Hilger NEXT in Vienna titled Ominvores .

Short films
 Pirovat 2003
 Tvísaga  2006
 Einskonar Alaska 2008

References

External links
Artist website
Erró um Úlf og Úlfur um Erró – Vísir

From Iceland — Artist Talk: Úlfur Karlsson

1988 births
Ulfur Karlsson
Ulfur Karlsson
Swedish artists
Swedish film directors
Ulfur Karlsson
Living people